Discus scutula is a species of small air-breathing land snail, a terrestrial gastropod mollusk in the family Discidae, the disk snails.

This species is endemic to Spain.

References

Discidae
Endemic fauna of Spain
Gastropods described in 1852
Taxonomy articles created by Polbot
Taxobox binomials not recognized by IUCN